The Goya Award for Best New Actress is one of the Goya Awards, Spain's principal national film awards.

Since its inception, the award has been given to 27 actresses. At the 9th Goya Awards ceremony held in 1995, Ruth Gabriel was the first winner of this award for her role in Running Out of Time. Since the 26th edition (2011) to be a candidate in any acting category, the only condition is to be over 16 years of age. Before that edition, four actresses under 16 years of age won the award: Ivana Baquero, Nerea Camacho, Marina Comas and María Valverde. Benedicta Sánchez is the oldest winner at the age of 84 for her role in Fire Will Come.

The only actress who has won Goya awards in all three acting categories (best new actress, best actress, best supporting actress) is Laia Marull.

As of the 2023 ceremony, Laura Galán is the most recent winner in this category for her role as Sara in Piggy.

Winners and nominees
In the following table, the years are listed as per Academy convention, and generally correspond to the year of film release; the ceremonies are always held the following year.

1990s

2000s

2010s

2020s

References

External links
Official site
IMDb: Goya Awards

New Actress
Film awards for lead actress
Awards for young actors